Eoophyla crassicornalis is a moth in the family Crambidae. It was described by Achille Guenée in 1854. It is found on Java.

References

Eoophyla
Moths described in 1854